Acalypha chamaedrifolia, the red cat's tail, is a species of flowering plant in the family Euphorbiaceae, native to southern Florida and the islands of the Caribbean. It performs best in a loam-less potting mixture. As its synonym Acalypha hispaniolae it gained the Royal Horticultural Society's Award of Garden Merit in 2002, but this seems to have been revoked.

References

chamaedrifolia
Flora of Florida
Flora of the Bahamas
Flora of the Cayman Islands
Flora of Cuba
Flora of the Dominican Republic
Flora of Haiti
Flora of Jamaica
Flora of the Leeward Islands
Flora of Puerto Rico
Flora of the Windward Islands
Plants described in 1866